Drèents (also Dreins, Dreints, Drents, Drints) is a collective term for Westphalian dialects spoken in Drenthe, a province of the Netherlands. They are spoken by about half of the population of the province.

Dialects of Drèents
The dialects from the north and the east (see below: 'Noordenvelds' and 'Veenkoloniaals') are somehow more related to Gronings (a Northern Low Saxon dialect), the dialects from the south-west are 'Stellingwerfs', and the dialects in a few villages along the southern border with the Grafschaft Bentheim (Germany) are considered to be Sallaans (because they have an umlaut in the diminutives).

The foundation Stichting Drentse Taol distinguishes seven main variants of Drèents within the province, based upon the research made by G.H. Kocks, the main editor of the Woordenboek der Drentse Dialecten (Dictionary of the Drèents Dialects):
 Noordenvelds
 Veenkeloniaols
 Zuudoost-Zaand-Drèents
 Zuudoost-Veen-Drèents
 Midden-Drèents
 Zuudwest-Noord-Drèents (Also see Stellingwarfs)
 Zuudwest-Zuud-Drèents
It also can be divided into Midden-Drents and Zuid-Drents.

Examples of usage

References

Languages of the Netherlands
Dutch Low Saxon
Westphalian dialects
Culture of Drenthe
Culture of Overijssel